Route 38 is a state highway in the U.S. state of Massachusetts, traveling  from Route 28 in Somerville north via Lowell to the New Hampshire state line in Dracut, where it continues as New Hampshire Route 38 in Pelham, New Hampshire. Although its southern terminus is at Route 28, some signage indicates that Route 38 continues south towards Sullivan Square in Boston.

History
The majority of Route 38 was originally designated as Route 6B in the New England road marking system, an alternate to New England Interstate Route 6. It began at Route 6 somewhere in Cambridge and made its way to present Route 38 in Somerville, running north on much the same alignment as is followed now, with the only real differences in Medford (where it used High Street (Route 60) rather than the Mystic Valley Parkway) and in Winchester center (where it ran via the rotary). In Lowell, Route 6B turned west on current Route 110, ending at the corner of Appleton Street and Gorham Street. (Route 6 came from the south on Gorham and turned west on Appleton; Route 6B came from the east on Appleton.)

In 1927, Route 6 became U.S. Route 3 north of Boston, and Route 6B became Route 3B. By 1928 the alignment in Cambridge was finalized. It began at the north end of the Boston University Bridge, which carried US 3 across the Charles River, and ran east on present Memorial Drive and Land Boulevard before turning north on the Northern Artery (present Route 28) to reach present Route 38 at Mystic Avenue. The whole alignment south of Mystic Avenue was shared with U.S. Route 1 and Route 28.

Between 1929 and 1933, Route 3B was renumbered Route 38. Between 1945 and 1950, it was extended north from Lowell to cross the Merrimack River on Gorham Street, then its present alignment to the newly formed New Hampshire Route 38. The present alignment in Lowell was adopted in or after 1954, when the new bridge across the Merrimack River was built.

By 1937, the concurrency with Route 60 in Medford was removed, and Route 38 was moved to use South Street between Main Street and Winthrop Street. Later it was shifted north to the Mystic Valley Parkway (Route 16) due to South Street becoming one-way eastbound.

In the early 1970s, many routes in the Boston area were renumbered or realigned. Route 38 was simply cut back to its split with Route 28, as it was concurrent with other routes the rest of the way to its southern end, and it was no longer tied to U.S. Route 3. At some point in the 1990s, directional signs were installed showing Route 38 continuing southeast from Route 28 towards Sullivan Square.

By 1989, Route 38 was moved to a short bypass around the rotary in Winchester center. Prior to that, it was coextant with Main Street all the way from the Medford-Winchester line to the Tewksbury-Lowell line. Even north of the Tewksbury-Lowell line, Main Street continues as Rogers Street for exactly one mile before Route 38 splits onto Nesmith Street towards Route 110; Main Street finally ends under the mentioned Rogers Street name around 3000 feet after that split at Lawrence Street in downtown Lowell.

Major intersections

References

 MassGIS (Bureau of Geographic Information), Commonwealth of Massachusetts EOTSS

038
U.S. Route 3
Transportation in Middlesex County, Massachusetts
Transportation in Somerville, Massachusetts
Transportation in Medford, Massachusetts
Woburn, Massachusetts
Wilmington, Massachusetts
Tewksbury, Massachusetts
Transportation in Lowell, Massachusetts
Dracut, Massachusetts